A Thought Crushed My Mind is the second album by Swedish post-hardcore band Blindside produced by Tooth & Nail Records. Originally released under Solid State Records, the album was re-released on May 10, 2005 by DRT with the addition of 5 bonus tracks. The album artwork was also expanded, including song lyrics previously omitted.

Track listing
 "Vow of Silence" – 3:48
 "As You Walk" – 4:07
 "King of the Closet" – 4:04
 "My Mother's Only Son" – 5:43
 "Act" – 3:47
 "SilverSpeak" – 3:26
 "Where Eye Meets Eye" – 3:46
 "Nära" – 4:47
 "In the Air of Truth" – 3:01
 "Across Waters" – 4:28
 "Nothing But Skin" – 9:18

Bonus tracks
 "Knocking on Another Door" – 1:48
 "Sunrise" – 3:20
 "From Stone to Backbone" – 4:21
 "All You Need Is..." – 2:08
 "[phatbeat 1303]" – 4:07

Personnel

Christian Lindskog – vocals
Simon Grenehed – guitar
Tomas Näslund – bass
Marcus Dahlström – drums

References

Blindside (band) albums
2000 albums
Tooth & Nail Records albums
2005 albums
Solid State Records albums